A Scout Group is a local organizational structure in some Scouting organizations that consists of different age programs, gender units and/or multiple units of the same age program.

The World Organization of the Scout Movement states: "The local group should in fact be viewed as a kind of educational centre, which is capable of implementing the whole Scout programme, from childhood until the end of adolescence. The units in the different sections have to be part of a local group and not isolated."

History
The term "Scout Group" was used for an organizational structure as early as 1914 by a competing Scout organization to The Boy Scouts Association in the United Kingdom.

The Boy Scouts Association adopted the term Scout Group in 1928 for Boy Scout Troops, Wolf Cub Packs and/or Rover Crews that were linked together under a Group Scoutmaster. Previously, The Boy Scouts Association had registered Boy Scout Troops, Wolf Cub Packs and Rover Crews separately even where they were operated by the same committee, school, church or other organization. Many Scout Groups had already effectively existed but were not formalized by The Boy Scouts Association. At The Boy Scouts Association's Bournemouth Conference of April 1927, John Frederick Colquhoun presented a paper titled 'The position of Rover leaders' which resulted in discussion on co-ordination (i.e. who was in charge) between Wolf Cubmasters, Scoutmasters and Rover leaders that led to the establishment of the Scout Group organizational structure and new rank of Group Scoutmaster from 1 January 1928.

By country

Australia
The situation in Scouts Australia is broadly the same as in the United Kingdom, though the leader in charge is known as the Group Leader, or, if there is no Group Leader, Leader-in-Charge, an experienced Leader nominated to liaise between the group and the Scouting bureaucracy.

Venturer units can be group- or district-based, depending on the numbers in the district at the time. Rover Crews can be associated with a group or stand alone. In most branches, groups are part of a district, which is part of a Scout Region, although this does vary from state to state.

Groups aim to have at least one Joey Scout Mob, Cub Scout Pack, Scout Troop, Venturer Unit, and an associated Rover Crew, although there are no limits to the number of each a single group may run, providing they have youth members and Leaders to populate it.

Sponsored groups also exist, which are joint ventures between Scouts Australia and another body such as schools or churches. Sponsored groups deliver a slightly altered program in conjunction with their parent bodies.

Italy
Scouting and Guiding in Italy is very fragmented. There are two World Organization of the Scout Movement and World Association of Girl Guides and Girl Scouts recognized Scout and Guide associations (which together form Federazione Italiana dello Scautismo).

In Associazione Guide e Scouts Cattolici Italiani (AGESCI), the Italian Catholic Guides and Scouts association, the group structure is very important. A typical Scout group is composed of a pack, a troop and a Rover crew. Sometimes, some of these units might be duplicated. Each Scout group has a "Comunità capi" (leader's community) where all adult leaders belong. It meets quite often (sometimes weekly) to plan all educational activities in the Scout group. Its work is driven by a three-year plan. This plan (Progetto Educativo di Gruppo) gives a common thread to the programme of all units, ensuring a common focus across all age ranges.

In Corpo Nazionale Giovani Esploratori ed Esploratrici Italiani (CNGEI) each Scout group can only include at most one pack, a troop and a rover crew. All the Scout groups in the same town compose a section. Adults are registered at the section level instead of the group level.

United Kingdom
In The Scout Association of the United Kingdom, Scout Groups can have any number of Beaver Scout Colonies, Cub Scout Packs and Scout Troops, depending on the numbers of young people and leaders available. A Scout Group can also include a Scout Active Support Unit, and an Explorer Scout Unit may be attached to a Group, although the Explorer Unit remains under the control of the district rather than the group.  Scout Groups in the United Kingdom are numbered according to their formation, although not all groups follow this rule. Initially, The Scout Association reserved registration numbers for troops or Groups not attached to a church, so a Scout Group attached to a church may have been registered as 7th Gloucestershire even though it was the first formed in the location. Sometimes, Scout Groups adopt new names (for example, the 1st Whitley Scout Group became the 43rd Reading (1st Whitley) Scout Group) as District boundaries are moved and reformed. When a Scout Group is registered, a Certificate of Registration is issued by Scout Headquarters, confirming the group's registration name which may differ from its own name. Groups may also register as Sea Scout Groups or Air Scout Groups.

A Scout Group is led by a Group Scout Leader (GSL) whose responsibility is to ensure that the leaders of the different sections work together facilitating progress from one section to another by the young people in the group. The GSL is also responsible for ensuring that the other leaders in the group take part in leader training. Scout Groups are managed by an executive committee, with a chairman, secretary and treasurer. They support a uniformed Group Scout Leader, and support the activities and events organised by the section leaders within the group. The executive committee is elected annually by the Group Scout Council, a gathering of the parents, adult leaders and representatives of the young people of the group.

Scout Groups can form relationships with local organisations, such as local churches, temples, schools or the YMCA. Typically, this involves agreements to support certain events in exchange for the use of a building or some financial payment. These Groups are described as Sponsored Scout Groups and must arrange a Sponsorship Agreement with the organisation that sponsors them and with the district commissioner. Groups without this type of affiliation are described as Open Scout Groups. Joint Scout and Guide Groups are supported by The Scout Association and Girlguiding; in these Groups, typically Scout and Guide sections share the same meeting place, equipment, funding and Executive Committee. A Scout Group meet in a school or church hall, or may be the owners of a Scout headquarters building.

The situation is similar in the Baden-Powell Scouts' Association, where the Scout Group is led by a Group Scout Master (GSM).  Within the B-PSA the group is responsible for local provision through the entire age range.

See also
Scout District

References

Scouting